Kelee Jahare-Hale Ringo (born June 27, 2002) is an American football cornerback for the Georgia Bulldogs. He was a two-time CFP national champion with the Bulldogs, winning in 2021 and 2022.

High school career
Ringo attended Saguaro High School in Scottsdale, Arizona. He was selected to the 2020 All-American Bowl. The number one ranked cornerback of his class, Ringo committed to play college football at the University of Georgia. Ringo also ran track in high school.

College career
Ringo missed his first season at Georgia in 2020 due to a labrum injury and took a redshirt. He became a starter during his redshirt freshman season in 2021. He returned an interception for a touchdown in Georgia's 2022 College Football Playoff National Championship win.

References

External links

Georgia Bulldogs bio

Living people
Players of American football from Arizona
American football cornerbacks
Georgia Bulldogs football players
2002 births
Sportspeople from Tacoma, Washington